Wallis Pang (born 26 August 1973) was once an actress with Television Broadcasts Limited, who first came into fame in File of Justice. She is popularly known for her role Ah Jing in A Kindred Spirit, in which she was paired with Lap San, played by Marco Lo and was named as one of the Five Fresh Beauties of TVB. She is no longer active in acting.

Filmography
 File of Justice IV (1995)
Cold Blood Warm Heart (1995)
The Legend of Master Chan (1996)
The Hitman Chronicles (1996)
The Criminal Investigator II (1996)
A Road and A Will (1997)
A Kindred Spirit (1997-1999)
Moments of Endearment (1998)
A Matter of Business (1999)
Detective Investigation Files IV (1999)
Ultra Protection (1999)

Films
 Don't Fool Me (1991)
 Fight Back to School (1991)
 Fist of Legend (1994)
 Troublesome Night 3 (1998)

References
Chinese Wikipedia
彭子晴
Starring....Wallis Pang
Wallis Pang 

1973 births
Living people
TVB actors
Hong Kong people of Hakka descent